Poe divination (from the 'poe' (桮) in the Hokkien , Min Dong BUC: buăk-bŭi, "cast moon blocks", also called as "bwa bwei", Mandarin ) is a traditional Chinese divination method, in which the divination seeker throws or drops two little wooden pieces on the floor and gets the divine answer by the positions of the pieces whether the future course being contemplated is recommended or not. The pieces, called "Poe" (Bwei) in Taiwanese or Jiaobei in Mandarin, look somewhat like two shells of a clam or bivalve mollusk.

Poe Divination using two little wooden pieces upon throwing, can result in often three answers. 
The last would be , when both blocks have their flat sides facing up, this serves as the Deity's amusement at the devotee's question or plea.
 
This type of divination rarely seen, often means that the deity is sending a strong message and sometimes devotees would invite temple staff or mediums to determine what it means.

Poe divination can be observed at Taoist and Chinese temples, such as Guangdi temples and Mazu temples, not only in China and Taiwan, but also in the rest of the world.

See also 
 Fuji (planchette writing)
 I Ching divination
 Jiaobei
 Kau cim
 Tangki
 Tung Shing

References

External links 
 Taiwanese Poe Divination

Divination
Practices in Chinese folk religion
Taoist divination